O.K. is a mixtape by Kool A.D., released November 26, 2015. The album features guest appearances from Killer Mike, Shady Blaze, Angel Haze, Lakutis, Despot, Chairlift, Toro Y Moi, Talib Kweli, Boots Riley of The Coup, and Mr. Muthafuckin' eXquire and is composed of 100 songs, meant as a "spiritual soundtrack" to his upcoming 100-chapter novel, also titled O.K.

Critical reception 
Upon release, the album was described by The Fader as Kool A.D.'s "most ambitious musical project yet," and Okayplayer called it "a blistering and damn impressive piece of work".

Track listing

References

External links
O.K. at Bandcamp

2015 mixtape albums
Kool A.D. albums